Cinnabar Elementary School District  is a public school district based in Petaluma, Sonoma County, California.

References

External links
 

School districts in Sonoma County, California